Henry Bouverie William Brand, 1st Viscount Hampden  (24 December 181414 March 1892), was a British Liberal politician. He served as Speaker of the House of Commons from 1872 to 1884.

Background and education
Brand was the second son of General Henry Trevor, 21st Baron Dacre, who inherited the barony in 1851, second son of Thomas Brand and Gertrude Roper, 19th Baroness Dacre. His mother was Pyne, daughter of the Very Reverend the Hon. Maurice Crosbie, Dean of Limerick, son of the 1st Lord Brandon (Brandon's wife was a granddaughter of Sir William Petty, FRS). He descended, almost directly, from Colonel John Hampden, "the Patriot"; his forebear, Sir John Trevor III (1624–72) of Plas Teg, son of Sir John Trevor II of Plas Teg and Trevalun, by Anne daughter of Sir Edmund Hampden of Wendover, had married John Hampden's daughter Ruth, who was his first cousin. That is to say the 19th Baron Dacre (aka Gertrude Roper (d.1819) wife to Thomas Brand V (1749–94)) was the great-great-granddaughter of The Patriot.

He was educated at Eton and was a member of Brook's, Reform and Athenaeum clubs. Brand was in the Coldstream Guards for 12 years, from 20 April 1832 until 6 September 1844. He was their 963rd officer. His father, the General, had been their 690th officer serving 28 years between 1793 and 1821.

Political career

Brand entered parliament as MP for Lewes as a Liberal in 1852, then returned as one of the three members for Cambridgeshire in 1868 (displacing colleague Richard Young (MP) of Wisbech, and for some time was Chief Whip of his party. He was a Lord of the Treasury during the first Palmerston ministry, and Parliamentary Secretary to the Treasury during the second. At some point, he was Keeper of the Privy Seal to the Prince of Wales. In 1872 he was elected speaker and retained this post till February 1884. It fell to him to deal with the systematic obstruction of the Irish Nationalist Party, and his speakership is memorable for his action on 2 February 1881 in refusing further debate on W. E. Forster's Coercion Bill—a step which led to the formal introduction of the closure into parliamentary procedure. He was appointed a GCB in 1881 and on his retirement he was created Viscount Hampden, of Glynde in the County of Sussex. In 1890 he also succeeded in the barony of Dacre on the death of his brother.

Estates
According to John Bateman, who derived his information from statistics published in 1873, Hon. Sir Henry Bouverie William Brand, G.C.B., of Glynde, Lewes, had 8,846 acres in Sussex (worth 8,121 guineas per annum).

Family
Lord Hampden married Eliza (born 1818 – died 8 March 1899, Pelham House, Lewes), daughter of General Robert Ellice by his wife Eliza Courtney, illegitimate daughter of Charles Grey, 2nd Earl Grey by Georgiana, Duchess of Devonshire, on 16 April 1838. They had five sons and five daughters:

Hon. Alice Brand (1840–20 March 1925) she married Sir Henry Thomas Farquhar, 4th Bt. on 8 July 1862. They had four children. 
Henry Brand, 2nd Viscount Hampden (2 May 1841 – 22 November 1906) he married Victoria Van de Weyer on 21 January 1864. He remarried Susan Henrietta Cavendish on 14 April 1868. They had nine children.
Hon. Gertrude Brand (1844–21 December 1927) she married Colonel William Henry Campion on 2 September 1869. They had eight children. 
Hon. Mabel Brand (1845–29 May 1924) she married Freeman Frederick Thomas on 18 June 1863. They had four children including Freeman Freeman-Thomas, 1st Marquess of Willingdon. 
Rear-Admiral Hon. Thomas Seymour Brand (20 September 1847 – 12 November 1916) he married Annie Blanche Gaskell, daughter of Henry Lomax Gaskell, on 4 December 1879. They had two children. 
Hon. Mary Cecilia Brand (18 January 1851 – 24 June 1886) she married Henry Parkman Sturgis on 2 October 1872. They had six children.
The Honorable Arthur Brand (1 May 1853 – 9 January 1917) he married Edith Ingram, daughter of Joseph Ingram, on 15 April 1886. They had one son. 
Major Hon. Charles Brand (1 May 1855 – 25 August 1912) he married Alice Sturgis Van de Weyer on 15 August 1878. They had four children. 
The Honorable Maud Brand (18 August 1856 – 8 January 1944) she married David Augustus Bevan, son of Richard Lee Bevan, on 22 October 1885. They had four children. 
Richard Brand (1857–1858)

Lord Hampden died on 14 March 1892, aged 77 and Lady Hampden died in March 1899.

Arms

References

External links 
 
 Parliamentary Archives, Papers of Henry Bouverie William Brand, 1st Viscount Hampden

Hampden, Henry Brand, 1st Viscount
Hampden, Henry Brand, 1st Viscount
People educated at Eton College
23
Coldstream Guards officers
Hampden, Henry Brand, 1st Viscount
Liberal Party (UK) MPs for English constituencies
Hampden, Henry Brand, 1st Viscount
Hampden, Henry Brand, 1st Viscount
UK MPs 1852–1857
UK MPs 1857–1859
UK MPs 1859–1865
UK MPs 1865–1868
UK MPs 1868–1874
UK MPs 1874–1880
UK MPs 1880–1885
Hampden, Henry Brand, 1st Viscount
UK MPs who were granted peerages
Speakers of the House of Commons of the United Kingdom
1
Younger sons of barons
People from Glynde
Peers of the United Kingdom created by Queen Victoria
Ellice family